The Chaconia Medal is the second highest state decoration of the Republic of Trinidad and Tobago. Established in 1969, the medal honours long and meritorious service to promote national welfare or community spirit. It is awarded in three classes: gold, silver and bronze. The medal may only be awarded to ten individuals annually.

Recipients

References

Recipients of the Chaconia Medal
Orders, decorations, and medals of Trinidad and Tobago
Awards established in 1969
1969 establishments in Trinidad and Tobago